This is the list of the proper names for the stars in the constellation Crux. (Used modern western astronomy and uranography only)

List

Etymologies

α Cru 
 Acrux:
 ＜ coined from (en) the Alpha of Crux, the former English form of it Bayer designation, Alpha Crucis. It was invented by Elijah H. Burritt in his star atlas in 1833.
 Magalhanica:
 ＜ (pt) Magalhãnica, "the Magellanic", and meaning Estrela de Magalhães, "the Star of Magellan".

β Cru 
 Mimosa:
 ＜ In portuguese it means cuddly.  It also is a plant name mimosa.
 Becrux:
 ＜ analogy from Acrux of Alpha Crucis. It was coined from (en) the Beta of Crux, the former English form of it Bayer designation, Beta Crucis. It was invented by the editor of nautical almanac in the middle of the 20th century.

γ Cru 
 Gacrux:
 ＜ analogy from Acrux for Alpha Crucis. It was coined from (en) the Gamma of Crux, the former English form of it Bayer designation, Gamma Crucis. It was also invented by the editor of nautical almanac in the middle of the 20th century.
 Rubidea:
 ＜ (pt)?  (la)? rubídea, "reddish". According to Japanese astronomer Keishin Suzuki, it was invented by John Herschel.

δ Cru 
 Palida:
 ＜ (pt) pálida, "pale".

ε Cru 
 Intrometida:
 ＜ (pt) intrometida, "obtrusive".

See also 
 List of stars in Crux
 List of star names
 Bandeira do Brasil: Sobre as estrelas (Portuguese)

Notes

References

External links 
 da Silva Oliveira, R., "Crux Australis: o Cruzeiro do Sul", Artigos: Planetario Movel Inflavel AsterDomus.

Crux (constellation)
Crux